Pseudorasbora pumila, also known as the moroco, is a species of cyprinid fish endemic to Japan.

References

Pseudorasbora
Fish described in 1930